Dorian Descloix (born 14 March 1988) is a French tennis coach and former professional player.

Descloix has a career high ATP singles ranking of 666 achieved on 26 July 2010. He also has a career high ATP doubles ranking of 562 achieved on 10 October 2011.

Descloix made his ATP main draw debut at the 2015 Open Sud de France in the doubles draw partnering Gaël Monfils.

In February 2020, he became the hitting partner and subsequently coach for Victoria Azarenka. Upon his hiring, Azarenka won the title at the Western & Southern Open, her first title since 2016, and reached the final of the US Open, her first Grand Slam final since 2013. Descloix officially retired as a player in November 2020. He coached her until October 2021.

Descloix became the coach of Olympic gold medallist Monica Puig for the 2022 season to prepare for her comeback to the tour after injury and surgery.

He is currently coaching Dayana Yastremska.

References

External links
 
 

1988 births
Living people
French male tennis players
21st-century French people